Hemiplatynus chihuahuae is a species of beetle in the family Carabidae, the only species in the genus Hemiplatynus.

References

Platyninae